Balışeyh is a town and district of Kırıkkale Province in the Central Anatolia region of Turkey. At the 2000 Turkish census, the population of the district was 13,702, of whom 3,344 lived in the town of Balışeyh. Balışeyh is a historical town and thought to be built in the time of Seljuks.

Name
The name "Balışeyh" comes from the famous Sufi Sheik Edebali, who was the mentor and father-in-law of Osman I, founder of the Ottoman Empire.

Administrative situation
Beside Balışeyh's own municipality, there are two other Municipalities; Kulaksız and Koçubaba. 26 villages are administrated by these municipalities.

Notes

References

External links
 District governor's official website 

Populated places in Kırıkkale Province
Districts of Kırıkkale Province